Amanda Susan Phillips (born 4 July 1981 in Brisbane) is an Australian weightlifter, competing in the 75 kg category and representing Australia at international competitions. She participated at the 2000 Summer Olympics in the 63 kg event. She competed at world championships, most recently at the 1999 World Weightlifting Championships.

Major results

References

External links
 
 
 

1981 births
Living people
Australian female weightlifters
Weightlifters at the 2000 Summer Olympics
Olympic weightlifters of Australia
People from Brisbane
Weightlifters at the 2006 Commonwealth Games
Commonwealth Games competitors for Australia
Weightlifters at the 2010 Commonwealth Games
20th-century Australian women
21st-century Australian women